Gastón González may refer to:

 Gastón González (footballer, born 1988), Argentine midfielder
 Gastón González (footballer, born 1996), Argentine forward
 Gastón González (footballer, born 2001), Argentine midfielder